Yamula Dam is a dam and hydroelectric plant in Kayseri Province on Kızılırmak River, central Turkey.

The dam is in Kayseri Province on Kızılırmak (Hallys of the Antiquity). Its waterholding phase began in 2005. 

Being an artificial lake, it is home to various water sports. 

Nominal power is 52 MW and the annual energy production is 309 GW-hr.

References

Buildings and structures in Kayseri Province
Hydroelectric power stations in Turkey
Dams completed in 2005
Dams on the Kızılırmak River
2005 establishments in Turkey
Kızılırmak